Spectrum OC16 is a Hawaiian TV channel owned by Charter Communications (which acquired Oceanic Time Warner Cable in 2016), based in Honolulu, Hawaii and broadcasts to the state of Hawaii on Oceanic channel 12/digital 1012 for general interests, on channel 16/digital 1016 (also known as Spectrum Sports Hawaii) for sports programming, and on channel 255 for pay-per-view events, particularly University of Hawaii football.

Background
The channel, which was first launched as a cable access channel in 1976, offers a local alternative to the traditional produced television offerings featuring two channels, one operating on channel 12 that broadcasts in-house shows geared towards Hawaiians, while a second channel on channel 16 is devoted to local sports, including athletic events from the University of Hawaii. Both channels are also offered in HD and can be viewed on its in-demand channels on Spectrum's digital services.

In addition, Spectrum also offers a pay-per-view channel on channel 255 for select University of Hawaii football games.

Oc 16 in-house programming

Entertainment
Fashion Sense by Valerie
Brown Bags to Stardom
Da Brothers and Friends
Dis n Dat (This and that)
Eh, u da kine, ah
The Champ Show
Ken Yo Dama
Miss Hawaii Pageant
Overdrive Live
Pakele Live
Hawaii Reel Stories
Tiny TV

Cooking
Cooking Hawaii Style
Cooking With Cutty
Hawaiian Grown/Hawaiian Grown Kitchen

Personal Interests/Hobbies
Crazy Deals TV
The Pet Hui
Island Driver TV
Joy of Crafting
Hawaii's Wedding Professionals
Showcase Hawaii
Think Tech
Upside-Down Pilates
Wedding of a Lifetime
Career Changers

Travelling
Outside Hawaii
Ultimate Japan

Educational/Family Oriented
Building Blocks for Tots
If I Neva Do D.A.T. (Drugs, Alcohol, Tobacco)
Outstanding Educator
Play Smart Hawaii
Russell The Rooster
School Spirit, Professional Pride
Teach It Hawaii

Oc 16 sports programming
University of Hawaii athletic events
OC16 High School Sporting events
Billabong Surf TV
Flhi Girlz
Hawaii Goes Fishing
Hawaii Skin Diver
Hawaii Xtreme Sports
Inside OC16 Sports Rewind 
Kai Wahine
Molokai Hoe
Na Wahine O Ke Kai
OC 16 Daily Surf Report
Ocean Paddler TV
PacWest Magazine
Soul Surfers
Sports People Hawaii
Xterra Adventures
What SUP

References

External links
Oc 16 official website

Television stations in Hawaii
Charter Communications
Television channels and stations established in 1976
1976 establishments in Hawaii